__notoc__

Naxos disease (also known as "diffuse non-epidermolytic palmoplantar keratoderma with woolly hair and cardiomyopathy" or "diffuse palmoplantar keratoderma with woolly hair and arrhythmogenic right ventricular cardiomyopathy", first described on the island of Naxos by Nikos Protonotarios) is a cutaneous condition characterized by a palmoplantar keratoderma. The prevalence of the syndrome is up to 1 in every 1000 people in the Greek islands.

It has been associated with mutations in the genes encoding the proteins desmoplakin, plakoglobin, desmocollin-2, and SRC-interacting protein (SIP). Naxos disease has the same cutaneous phenotype as the Carvajal syndrome.

Symptoms 
Between 80 and 99% of those with Naxos disease will display some of the following symptoms:

 Disease of the heart muscle
 Thickening of palms and soles
 Sudden increased heart rate
 Dizzy spells
 Kinked hair

See also 
 Olmsted syndrome
 List of cutaneous conditions
 List of conditions caused by problems with junctional proteins

References

External links 

Genodermatoses
Palmoplantar keratodermas
Syndromes